Oleksandr Leonidovych Kuzin (born October 21, 1974) is a male long-distance runner from Ukraine who mainly competed in the marathon race. He set his personal best (2:07:33) in the classic distance on April 15, 2007 in Linz, Austria.

Achievements

External links

sports-reference

1974 births
Living people
Ukrainian male long-distance runners
Athletes (track and field) at the 2008 Summer Olympics
Olympic athletes of Ukraine